George Kwame Aboagye ( born 24 August 1968) is a Ghanaian politician and member of the Seventh Parliament of the Fourth Republic of Ghana representing the Asene-Akroso-Manso Constituency in the Eastern Region on the ticket of the New Patriotic Party.

Early life and education 
Aboagye was born on 24 August 1968 at Akim Manso in the Eastern region of Ghana. He earned his diploma at Zenith University college and his LLB at Lancaster University, Ghana campus.

Career 
He was the chief executive officer at Geospence Ghana Limited from 2008 to 2016.

Personal life 
Aboagye identifies as a Christian and an elder at the Church of Pentecost. He is married with four children.

Politics 
Aboagye won the seat of Asene-Akroso-Manso constituency on the ticket of the New Patriotic Party by obtaining 21,148 votes out of 31,078 valid votes cast, which is equal to 68.44%. He was then nominated to join the land and forestry committee and members holding offices of profits committee.

References 

Ghanaian MPs 2017–2021
1968 births
Living people
New Patriotic Party politicians
Ghanaian MPs 2021–2025